Zdebel is a Polish surname. Notable people with the surname include:

 Hubertus Zdebel (born 1954), German politician
 Tomasz Zdebel (born 1973), Polish-German footballer

See also
 

Polish-language surnames